Hanumangarh district is a district in the state of Rajasthan in India. The city of Hanumangarh is the district headquarters and its largest city.

District profile 
The district is located in the extreme north of Rajasthan. It has an area of 12,645 km2, a population of 1,774,692 (2011 census) and a population density of 184 persons/km2. It is bounded in the north by Punjab state, to the northeast by Haryana state, in the east and south by Churu District and in Bikaner District and on the west by Ganganagar District. The major livelihood of the district is farming; major crops include rice, millet, cotton, sonamukhi (senna), wheat, and vegetables. It is called the food basket of Rajasthan along with Sri Ganganagar. It is the 31st district of Rajasthan. It was made as district on 12 July 1994 from Ganganagar district. Earlier it was one of the Tehsils of Sri Ganganagar district.

The district contains the archaeological site of Kalibangan (Indus Valley civilisation), and Pallu. Some people informally call it Punjab of Rajasthan because of a large number of Punjabi speaking people in the district comparing to rest of Rajasthan, though Punjabi speakers are still in minority. Most of the people are able to understand Rajasthani (Bagri and other close dialects), Punjabi and Hindi.

Hanumangarh also has Bhatner Fort which is considered to be one of the oldest forts of India.

Demographics 

According to the 2011 census Hanumangarh district has a population of 1,774,692, roughly equal to the nation of The Gambia or the US state of Nebraska. This gives it a ranking of 269th in India (out of a total of 640). Hanumangarh is one of the highest per capita income earning district in India.

Its population growth rate over the decade 2001–2011 was 17.24%. Hanumangarh has a sex ratio of 906 females for every 1000 males and a literacy rate of 68.37%. 19.75% of the population lives in urban areas. Scheduled Castes and Scheduled Tribes make up 27.85% and 0.81% of the population respectively.

Languages 

Hindi is the official language. Bagri, a dialect of Rajasthani language, or Malvayi, a dialect of Punjabi language, are spoken by majority of population. Haryanvi, Sindhi, Sansi, and Sikh Bawari are other languages and dialects spoken at small level.

Bagri
Vernaculars include Bagri, a tonal language in the Rajasthani cluster spoken by the second majority of people. The district boasts of land of many Rajasthani writers in this dialect. Many villages in southern areas are famous centers for Rajasthani writers.

Punjabi language
Punjabi is spoken by 18% of district population. Punjabi has its ground as first language specially in the northern areas like Sangaria, Hanumangarh, Pilibanga tehsils. Punjabi is taught as a third language in many schools and also chosen by students up to postgraduate level. The Malwayi dialect is most common dialect of Punjabi language spoken. Other dialects are Bahawalpuri, Multani spoken by Arora and Rai Sikh communities who migrated from Pakistan after Partition.

Culture 
Rural kutcha homes with folk art can be seen in some remote villages, but this art is losing ground. Bagri culture dominates the district.

Such scenes are common in some southern villages. The embroidered Odhni (mostly red in colour) is a symbol of Bagri women. A long shirt and ghaghro (long frock type clothes) and borlo (a head ornament) is the traditional dress of Bagri women. Punjabi women wear a suit and salwar with chunni (cloth on head). This attire has also become popular with women of other communities. Some women of the Hindu and Muslim Seraiki people still wear  (long frock). The Purdah (or veil) is mainly in vogue among Bagri women. Men mainly wear a pant-shirt, kurta-payjama and dhoti (Punjabis call it the chadara-kurta). Punjabi music is very popular and are listened to with the same enthusiasm as in other northern Indian regions.

Bishnois, Sikhs, Meghwal and Jat people are the most prominent and most influential group of people in this part of India. The member of parliament from this region is Nihalchand Meghwal.

Places of interest 
Bhatner fort
Gurdwara Shaheeds Bhai Sukha Singh & Bhai Mahtab Singh Ji
Shila Mata Mandir
Bhadrakali Temple, 8 Hmh, Rajasthan
Kalibangan Archaeological Site
Kalibangan Archaeological Museum 
Brahmani Mata Mandir Pallu
Gurdwara Kabutar Sahib (Sri Guru Gobind Singh Ji), Nohar 
Gogaji Samdhi Temple, Gogamedi
Gorakshtilla, Gogana, Gogamedi

Fairs and carnivals 
The sixth emperor of Bikaner Maharaja Ram Singh is said to have constructed this temple on Emperor Akbar's desire. Though pilgrims visit the temple throughout the year but during the Mela days on Chaitra Sudi 8 and 9, thousands of pilgrims from Punjab, Haryana and Rajasthan visit the temple to worship Bhadrakali.

Shila Mata Mela - Shila Mata Mela takes place on every Thursday near Bus Stand, Hanumangarh Town. This 6' x 2.5' x 2' size stone is revered by Hindus, Sikhs and Muslims. The Hindus-Sikhs call this Shila Mata and Muslims call it Shila Peer.

Shaheed Bhai Sukha Singh Ji & Bhai Mahtab Singh Ji Yadgari Mela - The two Sikh shaheeds (martyrs) came to Hanumangarh to rest under a tree. This tree is said to be the tree where the head of Mughal Subedar Massa Khan Ranghar was left after the duo had returned from Amritsar after decapitating him; where Khan was belittling and desecrating the Harmandir Sahib under his authority. A large Sikh Gurdwara close to Bhatner Fort stands and it is said that tree still exists. A fair on every '25, Bhadhon Mahina' is joined by people from all castes and religions, including various political leaders. Pilgrims from Punjab also visit, mainly from the southern Malwa reaches such as Bathinda, Ferozepur, Faridkot, Fazilka and Hisar - most being Sikh. This shows harmony among various groups in society of Hanumangarh and Rajasthan and the continued connection of the district to Punjab.

 Gogameri Mela - Gogameri Mela takes place on every year in Nohar tehsil. This fair is held to worship Gogaji, a deity of Rajasthan.

References

External links 

 Official website

 
Districts of Rajasthan
1994 establishments in Rajasthan
Districts in Bikaner division